KLCX (106.9 FM) is a radio station licensed to Pueblo, Colorado. The station is operated by Educational Media Foundation.

History
The station signed on in November 1979 as KCSJ-FM at 107.1 FM. The call sign changed to KGRQ-FM in 1989, to KNKN in 1993, to KIQN in 2009, and to the current KLCX on October 30, 2014. The station moved to the 106.9 FM frequency in 2005.

On November 1, 2013, All Access reported KIQN would be sold by United States CP, LLC to Educational Media Foundation in exchange for Calhan-based KKCS and $400,000 cash.

External links

References 

LCX
Radio stations established in 1979
1979 establishments in Colorado
K-Love radio stations
Educational Media Foundation radio stations
LCX